South Shore, California may refer to:
South Shore, Alameda, California
South Shore Lake Tahoe